E-Werk is a live music venue located in Cologne, Germany. Opened in 1991, the building was a former power station built in the style of historicism. E-Werk has hosted artists such as Iggy Pop, Def Leppard, Meat Loaf, Foreigner, Europe, Huey Lewis and the News, Status Quo, Guano Apes, Alice in Chains, and Coldplay.

References

External links
 Official website

Music venues in Germany
Buildings and structures in Cologne